Gyan Bahadur Shahi popularly known as Gyanendra Shahi, is a Nepalese politician and a spokesperson of Rastriya Prajatantra Party. He was elected to the House of Representatives in the 2022 election from Jumla 1.

Political career 
Shahi joined Rastriya Prajatantra Party as a central committee member and spokesperson on 18 February 2022.

References

Living people
Place of birth missing (living people)
Nepal MPs 2022–present
Rastriya Prajatantra Party politicians
1992 births